United Nations Security Council resolution 664, adopted unanimously on 18 August 1990, reaffirming resolutions 660 (1990), 661 (1990) and 662 (1990), the Council recalled Iraq's obligations under international law and acting under Chapter VII of the United Nations Charter, demanded that Iraq permit and facilitate the departure of nationals from third countries from within Iraq and Kuwait, calling for consular and diplomatic access to the third state nationals.

The Council went on to demand that Iraq take no action that would jeopardise the safety of the nationals, reaffirming that the annexation of Kuwait is illegal, therefore demanding that Iraq rescind its orders to close consular and diplomatic missions in Kuwait and the removal of diplomatic immunity of their personnel. Thousands of foreigners were in Iraq and Kuwait at the time of the Iraqi invasion, and the Council denounced Iraq's decision to use foreign nationals as "human shields" at strategic sites.

Resolution 664 finally requested the Secretary-General Javier Pérez de Cuéllar to report on the compliance with the current resolution as soon as possible.

See also
 Foreign relations of Iraq
 Gulf War
 Invasion of Kuwait
 Iraq–Kuwait relations
 List of United Nations Security Council Resolutions 601 to 700 (1987–1991)

References

External links
 
Text of the Resolution at undocs.org

 0664
 0664
Gulf War
1990 in Iraq
1990 in Kuwait
 0664
August 1990 events